Madras Mail may refer to:

 The Mail (newspaper), known as The Madras Mail till 1928, an English-language daily evening newspaper
 Madras Mail (film), a 1936 Indian Tamil language film
 Howrah–Madras Mail, a mail train in India
 Mangalore–Madras Mail, a mail train in India
 Trivandrum–Madras Mail, a mail train in India